Yurty is an urban locality (a work settlement) in Tayshetsky District of Irkutsk Oblast, Russia, located on the Trans-Siberian Railway. Population:

References

Urban-type settlements in Irkutsk Oblast